This was the first edition of the tournament.

James Cerretani and Maxime Cressy won the title after defeating Ken Skupski and John-Patrick Smith 6–4, 6–4 in the final.

Seeds

Draw

References

External links
 Main draw

Tennis Challenger Hamburg - Doubles